USRC Resolute, was a revenue cutter of the United States Revenue Cutter Service in commission from 1867 to 1872.  She was the only Revenue Cutter Service ship to bear the name.

History
Built at Philadelphia, Pennsylvania, by J.W. Lynn, Resolute was commissioned in 1867 and served her entire career homeported at Key West, Florida. She was the second of the Active-class of six revenue schooners built at three different yards. Resolute and her sister ship , also built by Lynn, were among the last strictly sail-powered cutters built for the Revenue Service.

Notes
Footnotes

Citations

References used

 
 
 
 

Ships of the United States Revenue Cutter Service
Age of Sail ships of the United States
Ships built in Philadelphia
1867 ships